Hildegard Hillebrecht (26 November 1925 – 7 October 2018) was a German operatic soprano.

Career 
Born in Hanover, Hillebrecht studied singing after attending medical school and made her in the role of Leonora in Verdi's Il trovatore. She sang at the Zürich Opera House from 1952-1954, in Düsseldorf from 1954 to 1959 and at the Bayerische Staatsoper from 1961. She performed regularly at the Deutsche Oper Berlin and participated in many festivals including Salzburg and Munich.

Among Hillebrecht's commercial recordings are Strauss's Ariadne auf Naxos (with Jess Thomas, conducted by Karl Böhm, 1969) and Busoni's Doktor Faust (with Dietrich Fischer-Dieskau and William Cochran, 1969), both on Deutsche Grammophon.

Commercial videography 
 Strauss: Ariadne auf Naxos (Grist, Jurinac, Thomas; Böhm, Rennert, 1965) [live]

References

External links 
 

1925 births
2018 deaths
Musicians from Hanover
German operatic sopranos
20th-century German women opera singers
Place of death missing